Willy Ovesen (1 June 1924 – 3 January 2015) was a Norwegian civil servant.

He was born in Sørreisa, graduated with the cand.jur. degree and worked in the Norwegian Tax Administration from 1956. He was promoted to county tax director in Akershus in 1973, and served as director of the Norwegian Tax Administration (Tax Director) from 1982 to 1994. He died in 2015.

References

1924 births
2015 deaths
People from Sørreisa
Norwegian civil servants
Directors of government agencies of Norway